Ken Pridgeon Stadium is an outdoor American football stadium located in Houston, Texas. The stadium was built in 1977 and, along with Cy-Fair FCU Stadium, serves as the home field for all Cypress-Fairbanks Independent School District varsity football games, and soccer games. Cy-Fair ISD Stadium was renamed Ken Pridgeon Pridgeon Stadium in 1994, in honor of Oran Kenneth Pridgeon, who served as Cy-Fair ISD Athletic Director from 1967 to 1998. 

In May 2014, as part of a US$1.2 billion bond referendum, the stadium received $40 million for upgrades and renovations that are scheduled to be completed in two parts. Early renovations included parking lot improvements of LED lighting, new concrete in parking and driveways in the complex, as well as underground drainage. Later renovations, completed between December 2016 and January 2017, include a new natatorium expected to seat 950 people, a new two-story press box, new ticket booths, restrooms, concessions stand, and an elevator that goes up to the press box. The Oldest American Football stadium in the Cypress-Fairbanks Independent School District aside from Cy-Fair FCU Stadium.

References

American football venues in Houston
Cypress-Fairbanks Independent School District
Sports venues completed in 1977
1977 establishments in Texas